Bonny Light Horseman is the debut album by American folk supergroup Bonny Light Horseman, released on January 24, 2020. Recording began at the site of the defunct Rundfunk der DDR and concluded in January 2019 at Dreamland Recording Studios near Woodstock, New York. Upon release, the album was met with mostly positive reviews, and debuted at 92 on Billboard's Top Album Sales chart.

The album's title track reprises a Napoleonic Wars-era English lament. Eric D. Johnson joined singer-songwriter Anaïs Mitchell and multi-instrumentalist Josh Kaufman to form Bonny Light Horseman after learning they were reworking folk songs. Mitchell had previously researched Greek mythology for her Broadway musical Hadestown and solo album of the same name. Before recording the album, the group made their live debut at the 2018 edition of Eaux Claires music festival. Festival founders Aaron Dessner (guitar) and Justin Vernon (vocals) feature on Bonny Light Horseman and distributed the album under their 37d03d label.

The album received a Grammy Award for Best Folk Album nomination while the track "Deep in Love" was nominated for Grammy Award for Best American Roots Performance at the 63rd Annual Grammy Awards. The album was awarded Best Americana Record at the 2021 A2IM Libera Awards and was also nominated for Breakthrough Artist/Release.

Track listing

Charts

References 

2020 debut albums
Anaïs Mitchell albums